Mark Tildesley (born 1963) is a British production designer. Tildesley has collaborated with film directors Danny Boyle, Michael Winterbottom, Mike Leigh, Roger Michell, Paul Thomas Anderson and Cary Fukunaga. He studied theatre design at Wimbledon School of Art in the 1980s before transitioning to film work. In 1998, he won a BAFTA Cymru award for best production design for his work on House of America. He also worked with Danny Boyle as a designer for the 2012 Summer Olympics opening ceremony Isle of Wonder for which he won an Emmy Award for best art direction. In 2020, he replaced Dennis Gassner as the set designer for the 25th James Bond film No Time to Die.

Selected filmography
 Blue Juice (1995) - Carl Prechezer
 House of America (1997) - Marc Evans
 The Claim (2000) - Michael Winterbottom 
 24 Hour Party People (2002) - Michael Winterbottom 
 28 Days Later (2002) - Danny Boyle 
 Code 46 (2003) - Michael Winterbottom
 The Constant Gardener (2005) - Fernando Meirelles
 28 Weeks Later (2007) - Juan Carlos Fresnadillo
 The Boat That Rocked (2009) - Richard Curtis
 The Fifth Estate (2013) - Bill Condon
 High-Rise (2015) - Ben Wheatley
 In the Heart of the Sea (2015) - Ron Howard
 Snowden (2016) - Oliver Stone
 T2: Trainspotting (2017) - Danny Boyle
 Phantom Thread (2017) - Paul Thomas Anderson
 The Two Popes (2019) - Fernando Meirelles
 No Time to Die'' (2021) - Cary Fukunaga

References 

1961 births
Living people
Emmy Award winners
British film designers
English industrial designers
BAFTA winners (people)